The Georgian Labour Party (SLP) is a political party in Georgia that was founded in 1995 by Shalva Natelashvili.

History

1998 Local Elections 
In the 1998 local elections, the party received 20 percent of the votes.

1999 Parliamentary Elections 
The Labor Party received 7% in the 1999 parliamentary elections. The party blamed the authorities for rigging the elections.

2002 Local Self-Government Elections 
In the 2002 Local Self-Government Elections, the party won the majority of seats (26%) in the Tbilisi City Assembly.

2003 Parliamentary Elections 
The Georgian Labour Party received 12% in the 2003 parliamentary elections, which translated into 20 parliamentary mandates.

2008 Parliamentary Elections 
The Georgian Labour Party received 7.4% of the popular vote in the 2008 parliamentary elections.

Electoral performance

Parliamentary

Presidential

Local election

References

External links
Official website 
Shalva Natelashvili Facebook Page

1995 establishments in Georgia (country)
Article 3 of Protocol No. 1 of the European Convention on Human Rights
European Court of Human Rights cases involving Georgia (country)
Labour parties
Political parties established in 1995
Political parties in Georgia (country)
Populist parties
Pro-European political parties in Georgia (country)
Social democratic parties in Asia
Social democratic parties in Europe
Social democratic parties in Georgia (country)
Centre-left parties in Georgia (country)